Osman Nuri Pasha (c.1839, Istanbul - 1906, Istanbul) was a Turkish painter and military officer.

Biography
While his birth date has not been established, it is on record that he received his education in Istanbul, attending the Turkish Military Academy. In 1857, he received an appointment as court painter; serving under Sultans Abdülmecid I and Abdülaziz, who gave him paintings by European artists, to serve as examples for his work. 

As a court painter he was eventually promoted to Brigadier General (Tuğgeneral) and became an art teacher at Kuleli Military High School. Most of Turkey's best-known painters were among his students, including Ahmet Ziya Akbulut, Hoca Ali Rıza and Hüseyin Zekai Pasha. In 1877, during the Russo-Turkish War, he served as a military commander. 

Although he painted landscapes, most of his paintings deal with military subjects; notably battles and warships. These include his depiction of the Battle of Preveza (which was one of the first Turkish paintings to use Western-style oil techniques) and the sinking of the frigate Ertuğrul, following a good-will mission to Japan.

References

 Eczacibaşi Sanat Ansiklopedisi (Ezacibaşi Art Encyclopedia) Yem Yayin (Ed.), Yapi-Endüstri Merkezi Yayinlari, 3rd ed., pg.393, 1997

External links

1830s births
1906 deaths
Turkish painters
Artists from Istanbul
Turkish Military Academy alumni
Kuleli Military High School
Military art
Landscape painters